Isodesmosine is a lysine derivative found in elastin. Isodesmosine is an isomeric pyridinium-based amino acid resulting from the condensation of four lysine residues between elastin proteins by lysyl-oxidase. These represent ideal biomarkers for monitoring elastin turnover because these special cross-links are only found in mature elastin in mammals.

See also
 Desmosine

References

Amino acids